The 1955 municipal election was held October 19, 1955, to elect five aldermen to sit on Edmonton City Council and six trustees to sit on the public school board, while the mayor and four trustees for the separate school board were acclaimed. The electorate also decided ten plebiscite questions.

There were ten aldermen on city council, but five of the positions were already filled:
Edwin Clarke, Frederick John Mitchell, Ethel Wilson, Laurette Douglas, and Giffard Main (SS) were all elected to two-year terms in 1954 and were still in office.

There were seven trustees on the public school board, but one of the positions were already filled, as Donald Bowen was elected to a two-year term in 1954 and was still in office.  William Roberts and Rex Stevenson had also been elected to two-year terms in 1954, but had resigned; accordingly, John Thorogood (SS) and Herbert Turner were elected to one-year terms.  On the separate board, there were four vacancies, as James O'Hara, Adrian Crowe (SS), and John Kane were continuing.

Voter turnout

There were 14,248 ballots cast out of 126,990 eligible voters, for a voter turnout of 11.2%.

Results

 bold or  indicates elected
 italics indicate incumbent
 "SS", where data is available, indicates representative for Edmonton's South Side, with a minimum South Side representation instituted after the city of Strathcona, south of the North Saskatchewan River, amalgamated into Edmonton on February 1, 1912.

Mayor

Aldermen

Public school trustees

Separate (Catholic) school trustees

Plebiscites

 Financial plebiscite items required a minimum two-thirds "Yes" majority to bring about action

Paving

Shall Council pass a bylaw creating a debenture debt in the sum of $320,000 for the City share of standard paving of arterial and residential streets?
Yes - 9,764
No - 1,072

Asphalt Surfacing I

Shall Council pass a bylaw creating a debenture debt in the sum of $300,000 for the City share of asphalt surfacing on gravel for existing gravelled roads?
Yes - 9,490
No - 1,136

Asphalt Surfacing II

Shall Council pass a bylaw creating a debenture debt in the sum of $400,000 for the City share of asphalt surfacing on gravel for new roads at various locations within the City?
Yes - 8,930
No - 1,427

Bridge

Shall Council pass a bylaw creating a debenture debt in the sum of $2,000,000 for the construction of a bridge in concrete or steel or a combination of both, across the North Saskatchewan River at such location within the city as, in the opinion of Council, will most quickly and effectively improve the cross river traffic conditions, together with provision for approaches thereto including acquirements of all necessary lands?
Yes - 7,884
No - 3,030

Zoo

Shall Council pass a bylaw creating a debenture debt in the sum of $400,000 for the establishment and development in Laurier Park of a Zoo including provisions for sewer, water, roads, buildings, structures, animals, and necessary equipment?
Yes - 8,699
No - 2,184

Miscellaneous Neighbourhood Improvements
Shall Council pass a bylaw creating a debenture debt in the sum of $250,000 for the establishment and improvement of neighborhood parks, traffic circles, buffer zones, ravine side boulevards and works of a similar nature, including where necessary new roads, sewers, drains, fences, and general re-building?
Yes - 8,724
No - 2,764

Library
Shall Council pass a bylaw creating a debenture debt in the sum of $75,000 for the establishment, improvement, extension of library facilities including construction of a new building?
Yes - 7,418
No - 2,764

Health Clinic
Shall Council pass a bylaw creating a debenture debt in the sum of $60,000 for the purpose of a health clinic to look after inoculations, also the supervision of babies and pre-school children and preventative dental services?
Yes - 9,419
No - 1,251

Royal Alexandra Hospital (New Building)
Shall Council pass a bylaw creating a debenture debt in the sum of $700,000 to complete and furnish a new building at the Royal Alexandra Hospital containing kitchen, dining and other facilities, also additional facilities for nurses living quarters and nurses study and recreation facilities?
Yes - 7,704
No - 2,851

Swimming Pool
Shall Council pass a bylaw creating a debenture debt in the sum of $250,000 for the construction of an indoor swimming pool in the City south of the North Saskatchewan River at a location, which, in the opinion of Council, is most suitable and convenient for residents of Edmonton South?
Yes - 6,997
No - 3,477

References

Election History, City of Edmonton: Elections and Census Office

1955
1955 elections in Canada
1955 in Alberta